Harry C. Heller was an American football coach.  He served as the first head football coach at the University of Colorado at Boulder, coaching one season in 1894 and compiling a record of 8–1.  Heller attended Baker University and graduated from the University of Colorado in 1885.

Head coaching record

References

Year of birth missing
Year of death missing
Colorado Buffaloes football coaches
Baker University alumni
University of Colorado Boulder alumni